Bambusa chungii, commonly known as white bamboo or  tropical blue bamboo, is a large, tall bamboo species, often found in Hong Kong, and originating in southern China and Vietnam.  Its blue-green or white culms often reach a height of 10 m.

Description
The bamboo grove of this species often spreads to 3 m when mature, sometimes spreading to 5 m, often growing in company of trees in a humid, half-sunlight environment. Culms which can grow to a maximum height of 20 m or less are covered in naturally occurring white powder, which are used to waterproof the plant.

The two main types of bamboos are clumpers and running bamboos. Clumping bamboos, such as the B. chungii, are noninvasive bamboos (sympodial or pachymorph). They have short roots and form discrete clumps. Some types of clumping bamboos clump more tightly than others – meaning, the culms (canes) grow closely together, omitting light from being seen through the other side of a mature species. Each new culm that shoots up is larger than the last. Growth rates vary since they depend on soil, water, nutrient, weather conditions, climate, etc. It has been successful growing in Central Florida, some areas of California, and Hawaii.

References

chungii
Flora of China
Flora of Vietnam
Plants described in 1936